Margelidon is a rare French surname which is most prevalent in the department Allier in south-central France and is also to be found among French Canadians. It is an altered form of Margeridon, a regional diminutive of the female given name Marguerite, itself derived from the Greek word μαργαρίτης for "pearl" and made popular by saint Margaret the Virgin. Notable people with this name include:
Arthur Margelidon (born 1993), Canadian judoka 
Bertrand Margelidon (born 1981), French musician
Lola Margelidon, Canadian actress

References

French-language surnames